The second elections to the Arunachal Pradesh Legislative Assembly were held on 3 January 1980. The election was held simultaneously to the 1980 Lok Sabha election. 30 seats were up for election. A total of 95 candidates contested; 28 from the Indian National Congress (Indira), 28 from the People's Party of Arunachal, 11 from the Indian National Congress (Urs) and 28 independents. The PPA candidate in the Niausa Kanubari constituency, Wangnam Wangshu, was elected unopposed.

INC(I) won 13 seats (with 72,734 votes, 42.58%). The PPA also won 13 seats, with 70,006 votes (40.98%). The remaining four seats went to independents. In total independent candidates mustered 19,716 votes (11.54%). INC(U) failed to win any seats. The party obtained 8,361 votes (4.89%). For the first time a woman, Nyari Welly, was elected to the Assembly. After the election there were massive defections to the INC(I). Gegong Apang was elected Chief Minister after the election.

Results

Elected Members

References

 State Assembly elections in Arunachal Pradesh
1980s in Arunachal Pradesh
Arunachal